Angel of Mercy may refer to:

Books
 Angel of Mercy, novel by Andrew Neiderman
 Angel of Mercy, novel by Lurlene McDaniel

Film and TV
 The Angel of Mercy (film), a 1946 film by Youssef Wahbi
 Angel of Mercy (1993 film) by Miloslav Luther
 "Angel of Mercy", an episode of The Bionic Woman TV series, 1976
Angel of Mercy (1939 film) directed by Edward L. Cahn

Songs
 "Angel of Mercy", a song by Maurice Gibb and his daughter, Samantha Gibb, released in 2010 on the Bee Gees box set Mythology 
 "Angel of Mercy", a song by Black Label Society from the album Catacombs of the Black Vatican
 "Angel of Mercy", a song by the heavy metal band Chastain from the album Ruler of the Wasteland
 "Angel of Mercy", a song from the album Communiqué by Dire Straits 
 "Angel of Mercy", a song from the album A Different Kind of Weather by The Dream Academy 
 "Angel of Mercy", cover of the Chastain song from the album Crimson Thunder by HammerFall 
 "Angel of Mercy", a blues song by Homer Banks and Raymond Jackson, on the album I'll Play the Blues for You by Albert King
 "Angel of Mercy", a song from the album Rogues en Vogue by Running Wild
 "Angel of Mercy", a song by Al Stewart from the album Famous Last Words
 "Angel of Mercy", a song from the album Junction Seven by Steve Winwood

Other uses
 Angel of mercy (criminology)
 Abdul Sattar Edhi, founder of the Edhi Foundation
 Angel of Mercy, in the Islamic, Jewish and Christian traditions, a messenger from God, especially the archangel Michael
 Angel of mercy, affectionate nickname for a nurse
 Merciful Angel, code name used during the NATO bombing of Yugoslavia